Brad Devin Katona (born December 12, 1991) is a Canadian mixed martial artist and the reigning Brave CF Bantamweight Champion. Katona formerly competed in the UFC and was the featherweight winner of The Ultimate Fighter 27.

Personal life and background 
Katona was born in Winnipeg, Manitoba, Canada. He started training in karate at the age of five and earned his black belt at the age of 14. Katona graduated from Dakota Collegiate, where he competed in wrestling.

He started Brazilian Jiu-Jitsu at Winnipeg Academy of Mixed Martial Arts. In 2011, Katona fought and won in the Canadian Golden Gloves championship and the Ringside World Championships in Kansas City, Missouri.

He earned a degree in mechanical engineering from the University of Manitoba.

Mixed martial arts career

Early career
Katona began competing in mixed martial arts in 2010 earning an amateur record of 3–0. After turning professional he competed in smaller promotions earning himself an unbeaten record of 6–0, he then participated in the 27th season of The Ultimate Fighter: Undefeated.

Having previously earned a degree as a mechanical engineer, before deciding to focus fully on his MMA career in 2016. In 2017 he moved to Dublin to train with Straight Blast Gym Ireland under coach John Kavanagh. Later that year he would earn himself a spot on The Ultimate Fighter season 27: Undefeated which featured undefeated featherweights and lightweights.

The Ultimate Fighter: Undefeated
In November 2017, it was announced that Katona would be a cast member on  The Ultimate Fighter: Undefeated competing in the featherweight tournament. On the show, Katona first defeated Kyler Phillips via majority decision and in the semi-finals he defeated Bryce Mitchell via third round submission (rear-naked choke). Katona then went on to win the final against Jay Cucciniello via a unanimous decision at The Ultimate Fighter 27 Finale. In doing so he became the 3rd Canadian in the shows run to win the tournament and is also the first Canadian to win the competition outside of the TUF: Nations tournament format.

Ultimate Fighting Championship
Returning to bantamweight Katona faced Matthew Lopez in a bout on December 8, 2018 at UFC 231. He won the fight by unanimous decision.

Katona next faced Merab Dvalishvili on May 4, 2019, at UFC on ESPN+ 9 in Ottawa, Ontario, Canada. Katona would lose the fight via unanimous decision.

Katona faced Hunter Azure on September 14, 2019, at UFC Fight Night: Cowboy vs. Gaethje. Despite moments of success Katona would lose the fight via unanimous decision.

Katona was released by the UFC on February 11, 2020. After going 2–2 in the promotion.

Elite MMA Championship (EMC) 

In September 2020, it was reported that Katona signed with Elite MMA Championship (EMC) and he was scheduled to meet Stipe Brčić on October 31, 2020, in the co-main event of EMC 6. However, the event was postponed due to the COVID-19 pandemic.

Brave Combat Federation 

Katona faced Borislav Nikolić on April 1, 2021, at Brave CF 50. At weigh-ins, Katona came in 1.1 pounds (0.5 kg) over the bantamweight limit and was fined a percentage of his purse which went to his opponent. He won by guillotine in the third round.

Katona faced Bair Shtepin on August 21, 2021, at Brave CF 53. He won the bout via unanimous decision.

Katona defeated Hamza Kooheji on March 11, 2022, at Brave CF 57 for the vacant BRAVE CF Bantamweight Championship.

Championships and accomplishments
Ultimate Fighting Championship
The Ultimate Fighter 27 featherweight tournament winner
Brave Combat Federation
BRAVE CF Bantamweight Championship (One time)
One successful title defense

Mixed martial arts record

|-
| Win
|align=center|12–2
|Gamzat Magomedov
| Decision (unanimous)
|Brave CF 63
|
| align=center|5
| align=center|5:00
|Isa Town, Bahrain
|
|-
| Win
| align=center|11–2
| Hamza Kooheji
| Decision (split)
| Brave CF 57
| 
| align=center|5
| align=center|5:00
| Isa Town, Bahrain
| 
|-
| Win
| align=center|10–2
| Bair Shtepin
| Decision (unanimous)
| Brave CF 53
| 
| align=center|3
| align=center|5:00
| Almaty, Kazakhstan
| 
|-
| Win
| align=center|9–2
|Borislav Nikolić
|Submission (guillotine choke)
|Brave CF 50
|
|align=center|3
|align=center|0:40
|Arad, Bahrain
|
|-
| Loss
| align=center|8–2
| Hunter Azure
| Decision (unanimous)
| UFC Fight Night: Cowboy vs. Gaethje
| 
| align=center|3
| align=center|5:00
| Vancouver, British Columbia, Canada
| 
|-
| Loss
| align=center|8–1
| Merab Dvalishvili
| Decision (unanimous)
| UFC Fight Night: Iaquinta vs. Cowboy 
| 
| align=center|3
| align=center|5:00
| Ottawa, Ontario, Canada
| 
|-
| Win
| align=center|8–0
| Matthew Lopez
| Decision (unanimous)
| UFC 231
| 
| align=center|3
| align=center|5:00
| Toronto, Ontario, Canada
| 
|-
| Win
| align=center|7–0
| Jay Cucciniello
| Decision (unanimous)
| The Ultimate Fighter: Undefeated Finale
| 
| align=center|3
| align=center|5:00
| Las Vegas, Nevada, United States
| 
|-
| Win
| align=center| 6–0
| Stephen Cervantes
| Decision (unanimous)
| Mercenary Combat League 1
| 
| align=center| 3
| align=center| 5:00
| Winnipeg, Manitoba, Canada
| 
|-
| Win
| align=center| 5–0
| Austin Ryan
| Submission (kneebar)
| XFFC 13: Future Stars
| 
| align=center| 3
| align=center| 4:49
| Grande Prairie, Alberta, Canada
| 
|-
| Win
| align=center|4–0
| Patrick Ward
| Decision (unanimous)
| Havoc FC 11
| 
| align=center| 3
| align=center| 5:00
| Red Deer, Alberta, Canada
| 
|-
| Win
| align=center| 3–0
| Josh Rich
| Decision (unanimous)
| Prestige FC 2
| 
| align=center| 3
| align=center| 5:00
| Regina, Saskatchewan, Canada
| 
|-
| Win
| align=center| 2–0
| Myles Anderson
| Submission (guillotine choke)
| Prestige FC 1
| 
| align=center| 1
| align=center| 3:12
| Weyburn, Saskatchewan, Canada
| 
|-
| Win
| align=center| 1–0
| Michael Hay
| KO (punch)
| MFC 41: All In
| 
| align=center| 1
| align=center| 2:47
| Edmonton, Alberta, Canada
| 
|-

See also
 List of Canadian UFC fighters
 List of male mixed martial artists

References

External links
 
 

1991 births
Canadian male mixed martial artists
Lightweight mixed martial artists
Mixed martial artists utilizing Shotokan
Mixed martial artists utilizing Brazilian jiu-jitsu
Living people
Sportspeople from Winnipeg
Canadian male karateka
Canadian practitioners of Brazilian jiu-jitsu
People awarded a black belt in Brazilian jiu-jitsu
Ultimate Fighting Championship male fighters
People from St. Vital, Winnipeg